Disconnection Notice is the fifth official album by  American punk rock band Goldfinger. This was the band's last album to feature former Ünloco guitarist Brian Arthur; original guitarist Charlie Paulson returned after Arthur's departure.

Release
On July 27, 2004, it was announced that the band's next album would be titled Disconnection Notice; in addition to this, its track listing was posted online. "My Everything" was made available for streaming through the band's website on August 5, 2004. In November 2004, the album was announced for release in February the following year. In addition, "Wasted" was posted on the band's PureVolume profile, before being released to radio on January 25, 2005. On February 1, 2005, the music video for "Wasted" was posted online. In February and March, the group embarked on a US tour with the Start, City Sleeps and Bottom Line. Disconnection Notice was made available for streaming on February 9, 2005 through VH1's website, before being released six days later. "Stalker" was released to radio on May 17, 2005. In September and October 2005, they toured across New Zealand and Australia with Reel Big Fish and the Matches. They opened 2006 with a co-headlining West Coast US tour with Reel Big Fish, dubbed the Deep Freeze Tour; they were supported by Zebrahead and Bottom Line. Guitarist Charlie Paulson, who had left in 2001, re-joined the band for the trek. The band appeared at the Groezrock festival in April 2006.

Track listing
All songs are written by John Feldmann, except for "Wasted" and "Ocean Size" by John Feldmann and Benji Madden.

Personnel
John Feldmann – rhythm guitar, lead vocals
 Brian Arthur – lead guitar
Kelly LeMieux – bass
Darrin Pfeiffer – drums

Notes 
Track No. 1, "My Everything", was featured on the soundtrack of the video game SSX on Tour.
Track No. 8, "I Want", was featured on the soundtrack of the video games Burnout Revenge and Burnout Legends.
Track No. 7, "Behind The Mask" was originally called "FBI" (On Advance CD) but was renamed for the final retail release.
Track No. 9, "Iron Fist", was written due to the raid that took place on Feldmann's house.

References

2005 albums
Goldfinger (band) albums
Maverick Records albums
Albums produced by John Feldmann